Murcott may refer to:

Places in England
Murcott, Northamptonshire
Murcott, Oxfordshire
Murcott, Wiltshire

Other uses
Murcott (fruit) is a citrus variety